Kudakwashe Basopo (born 18 July 1990) is a Zimbabwean association football player. She is a member of the Zimbabwe women's national football team

She represented her nation in the football competition at the 2016 Summer Olympics.

She scored the nation's first goal in Olympic history against Germany on August 3. In the match versus Germany it was Rutendo Makore who set up a goal that took the German goalkeeper Almuth Schult by surprise. The ball was rebounded but Basopo made it a goal leaving the score at 6–1 against Zimbabwe.

References

External links

 

Zimbabwean women's footballers
Zimbabwe women's international footballers
Footballers at the 2016 Summer Olympics
Olympic footballers of Zimbabwe
Living people
1990 births
Women's association football forwards